Rao Raja Sri Sawai Pratap Singh Naruka was the founder king of Alwar State. He belonged to the Naruka clan of Kachhwaha dynasty.

History
Pratap Singh Naruka was the son of Rao Muhabbat Singh of Macheri. He was born in 1740. When still young, he was sent to relieve the famous fort of Ranthambor in 1759 which was besieged by the Marathas under the leadership of Gangadhar Tautia. He showed great bravery and ability in the battle that ensued at Kakod (in present Tonk District of Rajasthan). The Marathas fled away.

Once an astrologer at the Jaipur court predicted that the Rao would attain kingly dignity. Fearing his rise, court intrigues were hatched against him. A shot was also fired at him in 1765. Sensing a danger to his life, he left Jaipur immediately reached Rajgarh. From Rajgarh, he went to Jawahar Singh of Bharatpur who welcomed him and bestowed on him the jagir of Dehra village.In 1768, Jawahar Singh insulted the Jaipur Chief by marching without intimation of his motive, through his Stale, to visit the holy lake of Pushkar near Ajmer. On his return journey, he was attacked by the Rajputs of the State he had insulted and defeated at Maonda-Mandholi in the Tanwarati hills, 60 miles north of Jaipur. “The victory was, in a great measure, due to the transfer by Pratap Singh of his supporters to the side of his liegelord on the eve of the battle. He was moved to this either by the insult to his country, which a Rajput could ill bear, or by his desire to become reconciled with his own sovereign.” As a result of his loyalty, Pratap was restored to his fief of Macheri and was also allowed to build a fort at Rajgarh.

Madho Singh of Jaipur had died only four days after the battle of Maonda-Mandholi and Pratap Singh II, a minor succeeded him under guardianship of the mother of his younger brother. Pratap Singh gained great influence at the court through friends in the Council. At this time Najaf Khan, the imperial commander aided by Marathas, proceeded to expel Jats from Agra and then attacked Bharatpur. Pratap Singh aligned himself with Najaf Khan and aided him in defeating the Jats, "This timely succour and his subsequent aid in defeating the Jats, obtained for him the title of Rao Raja and a Sanad for Machheri, to hold direct of the crown.” Pratap Singh found an opportunity of reducing the fortress of Alwar which then belonged to the Jat princes of Bharatpur and seized it. He entered the fort of Alwar in November 1775.

The followers of Pratap Singh began to own him as their feudal lord as soon as the Alwar fort was taken. Some of estates were escheated to the new State. Lands were also snatched from the possessions of Jats. He increased his wealth by relieving a rich man at Thanaghazi of some of his possessions and by plundering Baswa, a town belonging to Jaipur State. This act resulted in a raid by the Jaipur ruler in person, upon Rajgarh fort. The Maharaja failed to take the place and to defeat his former vassal, on account of the alliance he had formed with the Marathas. 

He died on September 26, 1791.

See also
 Matsya Kingdom
 Bharatpur State

References

1740 births
1791 deaths
Maharajas of Alwar